Calytrix warburtonensis is a species of plant in the myrtle family Myrtaceae that is endemic to Western Australia.

It usually blooms between September and October producing white star-shaped flowers.

Found on stony hills and breakaways in the Goldfields-Esperance region of Western Australia between Laverton and Ngaanyatjarraku where it grows on sandy rocky soils.
 
The species was first formally described by the botanist Lyndley Craven in 1987 in the article A taxonomic revision of Calytrix Labill. (Myrtaceae) in the journal Brunonia.

References

Plants described in 1987
warburtonensis
Flora of Western Australia